Igor Anvar Kufayev  (born January 5, 1966), is a Russian British artist, yogi and spiritual teacher.

Early years 

Igor Kufayev was born in Tashkent, Uzbekistan. He was classically trained in art and attended the private studio of the martial artist and painter Shamil Rakhimov. Kufayev was educated at the Art College in Tashkent, and then at the Theater and Art Institute's department of Mural painting. In 1988 he studied in the Academy of Arts (now Imperial Academy of Arts) in St Petersburg, Russia, and in his spare time studied and painted directly from masterpieces of western art in the Hermitage Museum.

Artist

In 1990 Kufayev moved to Warsaw, Poland. An encounter with the art critic Andrzej Matynia led to Kufayev's first solo exhibition, Eternal Compromise at the Monetti Gallery, Warsaw. He was invited to take part in The Meeting of Sacred Images, at the National Museum of Ethnography in Warsaw, with his triptych Compromise alongside works by artists of earlier times.

He moved to London in August 1991, the same year his six-year-old daughter from his first marriage died in a road accident. He remained in a prolonged period of grief unable to paint, but came out of the slump in 1994, with a one-man exhibition entitled Burnt Earth, dedicated to the memory of his daughter; Robin Dutt gave it a favourable review in The Independent. He opened his own studio in London where he held private views of his work annually. From 1995 to 1997 he worked on a series of four tondos under the title Zauber. In January 1996 he was granted British Citizenship.

In 2001, the art critic Brian Sewell described Kufayev as a "driven painter, scrupulous draughtsman, intellect and imagination wrestling with seemingly equal force".

Transformation 
An early interest towards spirituality led to his practice of Yoga with initiation in 1996 to Transcendental Meditation. He immersed himself in the study of diverse spiritual traditions with special emphasis on Indian philosophy, Sufi, and Zen. In 2001, at the age of thirty six, in the wake of the TM-Sidhi Program (an advanced yogic course), Igor describes as having undergone a radical transformation of consciousness. He abandoned his art career and for the next five years he continued long hours of meditation, integrating expanded state of awareness throughout his daily activities.

Spiritual teacher

Kufayev began teaching in 2002, becoming full time in February 2008. Since 2012 he has offered online webinars and in-person gatherings and retreats worldwide.

Private life 

Igor lives with his partner and three children in Mallorca. In 2006 he moved back to Tashkent for almost four years. He has a grown-up daughter who lives in Warsaw.

References

External links
 Igor Kufayev's Official Website

Living people
1966 births
Yogis
Spiritual teachers
Artists from Tashkent